Lj (lj in lower case) is a letter present in some Slavic languages, such as the Latin version of Serbo-Croatian and in romanised Macedonian, where it represents a palatal lateral approximant . For example, the word  is pronounced . Most languages containing the letter  in the alphabet are phonemic, which means that every symbol represents one sound, and is always pronounced the same way. In this case, joining the letters L and J creates a new letter or a sound. The digraph is treated as a single letter, and therefore it has its own place in the alphabet, takes up only one space in crossword puzzles and is written in line in vertical text. However, it is not found on standard computer keyboards. Like its Latin counterpart, the  Cyrillic alphabet has a specific symbol for the same sound: Љ.

In sentence case, only L is capitalized.

Ljudevit Gaj first proposed this digraph in 1835.

See also
Љ, the Cyrillic version of Lj
Gaj's Latin alphabet

References

External links
Audio samples of the letter LJ

Latin-script digraphs
Serbo-Croatian language